Rikard Grönborg (born 8 June 1968) is a Swedish professional ice hockey coach and former defenceman. He was most recently the head coach of ZSC Lions of the National League. In addition, he was also formerly the coach of the Sweden men's national ice hockey team.

Playing career

Grönborg played college hockey at St. Cloud State University. He returned to Sweden in 1992-93 as a member of Rögle BK but went on loan to Tyringe SoSS, playing 32 games for Tyringe. In 1993-94, Grönborg played with Hammarby IF for 36 regular season games and 5 qualification games.

Coaching career

He started his coaching career in 1994 as an assistant coach at the University of Wisconsin-Stout.

He was the head coach of the Great Falls Americans of the AWHL from 1998-2003. He was an assistant coach with the Spokane Chiefs of the WHL in 2004-05. Then served as a scout for Sweden before taking the head coaching role at the junior and later the senior level. He was an assistant coach with Team Sweden under head coach Pär Mårts at the 2014 Winter Olympics. He was the head coach of the Swedish national team at the senior level from 2016-17 through 2018-19 before leaving the national team for ZSC Lions. As the head coach of the Swedish national team, Grönborg won the 2017 and 2018 IIHF World Championships.

In 2019-20, ZSC Lions ended the season first in the league, but the season was abandoned due to the COVID-19 pandemic. In 2020-21, ZSC Lions ended the season in 5th place and made the playoffs, however they were eliminated in the semifinals by Genève-Servette. Part way through the 2022-23 NL season, Grönborg was relieved of his duties at ZSC Lions and replaced by Marc Crawford

References

External links

1968 births
Living people
St. Cloud State Huskies men's ice hockey players
Sweden men's national ice hockey team coaches
Swedish ice hockey coaches
Swedish ice hockey defencemen
Phoenix Cobras players
Ice hockey coaches at the 2018 Winter Olympics
Swedish expatriate ice hockey players in the United States
Swedish expatriate sportspeople in Switzerland